Eloise B. Houchens Center is a Greek Revival style house in Bowling Green, Kentucky.  It was placed on the National Register of Historic Places in June 1980.

History
The house was built circa 1904 by Francis L. Kister, one-time Mayor of Bowling Green, Kentucky, and a local builder of note at the turn of the century. Kister also co-built the St. Joseph Catholic Church in Bowling Green.  His family occupied the house for 38 years, and then the Girls Club used it as a "home away from home" for young girls for over twenty years.  The Eloise B. Houchens Center for Women, Inc., a non-profit organization, was created in 1975 for the purpose of restoring and preserving the house.  The interior includes inlaid wood flooring, intricately carved fireplaces and mantles downstairs, and polished woodwork throughout.

Modern use
The Houchens Center is a cultural and educational center for the Bowling Green, Kentucky community, and a meeting place for clubs, associations, and the individual patrons who make up the membership.  The Center is also available to non-members for club meetings, workshops, retreats, receptions, parties and weddings.  Annual events include the Trees of Christmas in December, when over 30 decorated trees adorn the house.  The house is open for tours several times weekly year-round.

See also 
 Bristol Girls' Club in Connecticut
 National Register of Historic Places listings in Warren County, Kentucky

References

External links
TripAdvisor - Eloise B. Houchens Center
Facebook - Eloise B. Houchens Center

National Register of Historic Places in Bowling Green, Kentucky
Clubhouses on the National Register of Historic Places in Kentucky
Tourist attractions in Bowling Green, Kentucky
1904 establishments in Kentucky
Houses completed in 1904
Houses in Warren County, Kentucky
Houses on the National Register of Historic Places in Kentucky